Makerfield  is a constituency represented in the House of Commons of the UK Parliament since 2010 by Yvonne Fovargue of the Labour Party.

History
This seat was formed in 1983 mostly from the Ince and Wigan seats however with some of the Leigh seat.

Constituency profile
Makerfield is on some calculations, particularly a historical measure based on the period of time since a previous party served the area, the safest Labour seat in the country — with its predecessor constituencies, the area has been held by Labour since the Parliamentary Labour Party was formed in 1906.  In 2010 the constituency, of the 650 nationally, polled the 105th highest share of the vote for the Labour Party. However, Labour's majority fell significantly in 2019 as with many "Red Wall" seats.

There is no town called Makerfield itself; instead, the name refers to the suffix of 'in-Makerfield' of the towns Ashton-in-Makerfield and Ince-in-Makerfield, though since 2010 the latter is now part of the Wigan seat. The seat comprises mostly working-class residential suburbs south of Wigan and to the west of Leigh. Deprivation however is relatively lower than that of neighbouring towns and home-ownership is higher, with a mostly skilled working-class population and a lower than average proportion of ethnic minorities. There is some semi-rural land towards the west of the constituency where it borders St Helens and green buffers separating the constituent towns and villages. Formerly a coal-mining area, there is now a small amount of light industry remaining, though not as much as Wigan, and the area is mostly residential as the towns continue to grow. The area is also home to Winstanley College, one of the highest performing sixth-form colleges in the country, enrolling around 1800 students.

Boundaries 

1983–1997: The Metropolitan Borough of Wigan wards of Abram, Ashton-Golborne, Bryn, Lightshaw, Orrell, Winstanley, and Worsley Mesnes.

1997–2010: The Metropolitan Borough of Wigan wards of Abram, Ashton-Golborne, Bryn, Ince, Orrell, Winstanley, and Worsley Mesnes.

2010–present: The Metropolitan Borough of Wigan wards of Abram, Ashton, Bryn, Hindley, Hindley Green, Orrell, Winstanley, and Worsley Mesnes.

Makerfield consists of the western and central section of the Metropolitan Borough of Wigan in Greater Manchester. It comprises the wards to the south and to the west of Wigan and to the west of Leigh.

Members of Parliament

Elections

Elections in the 2010s

Elections in the 2000s

Elections in the 1990s

Elections in the 1980s

See also 
 Ince parliamentary constituency.
 List of parliamentary constituencies in Greater Manchester

Notes 
 Manchester Evening News: "McCartney makes it a century"

References

Parliamentary constituencies in Greater Manchester
Constituencies of the Parliament of the United Kingdom established in 1983
Politics of the Metropolitan Borough of Wigan